Thakurmunda is a block headquarter and a small market area in Mayurbhanj district in the state of Odisha, India. Thakurmunda is referred as the largest block of mayurbhanj district having a radius of 40kms. The nearest city is Karanjia (A Notified area council and also one of the sub-division of mayurbhanj district). Thakurmunda is a place to stay and tour the Mayurbhanj region. This region is home to Similipal, one of the most important wildlife parks of India. The national park comprises lush valleys, forest lands and scores of ancient temples.

Udaa yatra  is one of the main attractions of Thakurmunda.  Thakurmunda also hosts the third most popular Rath Yatra of Mayurbhanj.  Thakurmunda is also the home of the Mayurbhanj Chaangu dance, an ancient tribal dance and famous for its Tusu yatra on Makar Sankranthi.

Geography
It has an average elevation of 36 metres (118 feet).

Education
 Ramakrushna paramhansa school
 Maa Basuli College
 Kanyashram ( The Girl's Highschool)
 Boy's High school
 Kasturaba Gandhi Vidyalaya
 Government Primary, M.E School
 Aurovindo public school
 Saraswati sishu mandir
 Heritage English Medium School
 Jay prakash Narayan New Govt High School
 Mandaljhari UGUP school
 Kautilya English medium School

Transportation
Thakurmunda has direct bus services from capital city Bhubaneswar, Cuttack, Baripada, Keonjhar, Balasore, Rourkela, Bhadrak, Jajpur.
The nearest Airport is Bijupatnaik International Airport which is located at a distance of 182 KM from Thakurmunda.

 54 KM from Kaptipada
 62 KM from Udala
 108 KM from Baripada
 98 KM from Kendujhar
 105 KM from Balasore railway station
 42 KM from Karanjia

Tourist places

 Bhimkund is the nearest tourist place (around 18 km) from Thakurmunda.
 Khiching (Maa Kichakeswari Temple) 63 km from Thakurmunda.
 Bhairab Kund is another tourist place around 20 km from Thakurmunda besides river Salandi on SH Thakurmunda-Anandapur. There is a hilltop with spiritual activity.
Thakurmunda is popular for its Uda Yatra [Maha Vishuva Sankranti] falling on 14 April each year. Devotees of Maa Basuli known as Vakta recite spiritual activity by nailing in the back with iron nails and hanging themselves with a wooden log and making rounds at a high rising mast about 20 ft high.

References

Cities and towns in Mayurbhanj district